The Ford Model C is an automobile that was produced by Ford Motor Company. Introduced in 1904, it was a revision of the Model A with a more modern appearance. It had a slightly more powerful engine and a  longer wheelbase. Built at the Ford Piquette Avenue Plant, it was the entry-level car in the Ford model lineup, slotting below the upscale Model B. Production ended in 1905 with 800 cars made; it was replaced by the derivative Model F.

Both Models A and C were produced at the same time, but the Model A could also be bought with a Model C engine, an option called the AC. The Model C two-seater was marketed as a "doctor's car" and sold for $850 ($ in  dollars ), compared to the high-volume Oldsmobile Runabout at US$650, Western's Gale Model A at US$500, and the Success at a low US$250. It offered a four-seater option for an additional $100. The top also cost extra: rubber $30, leather $50.

Although the Model C had a protruding front "box" like a modern car, unlike the flat-front Model A, this was purely ornamental — the engine remained under the seat (the gas tank was under the hood).

The Model C was the first vehicle to be built at Ford Motor Company of Canada.

References

 
 

Model C
Cars introduced in 1904
1900s cars
Veteran vehicles
Cars powered by boxer engines
Cars powered by 2-cylinder engines
Motor vehicles manufactured in the United States